Jan Kristiansen (born 4 August 1981) is a Danish former professional footballer who played as a midfielder.

Biography
Kristiansen made his Danish Superliga debut for Esbjerg fB in the 1999–2000 season, which ended in the club being relegated to the Danish 1st Division. After a single season in the 1st Division, Kristiansen returned strongly to the Superliga and he would miss only two of 130 Superliga games over the following four seasons. Since November 2000 he was a member of various Danish national youth teams, and he was selected the 2002 Danish Under-21 Player of the Year. On 12 February 2003, he debuted for the senior Danish national team, coming on as a substitute in a 4–1 win against Egypt, and Kristiansen ended the 2002–03 season as joint Superliga top scorer, he and Søren Frederiksen both scoring 18 goals.

On 12 January 2006, it was announced that Kristiansen would leave Esbjerg fB with immediate effect and move abroad to 1. FC Nürnberg, at that time in the playing Bundesliga. In the 2006–07 seasons, he won the DFB-Pokal with the Franconians, scoring the winning goal in extra time, as Nürnberg beat VfB Stuttgart 3–2.

In July 2008, he returned to his homeland when he signed a five-year contract with Brøndby IF.

On 15 July 2013, he signed a half-year contract with FC Vestsjælland.

On 5 August 2016 Kristiansen announced, that he would retire and continue working as a realtor.

Honours
1. FC Nürnberg
DFB-Pokal: 2006–07

Individual
 Danish Under-21 Player of the Year: 2002
 Danish Superliga Top Goalscorer: 2002–03

References

External links
 
 Official Danish Superliga stats 
 
 

1981 births
Living people
People from Varde Municipality
Danish men's footballers
Association football midfielders
Denmark international footballers
Denmark under-21 international footballers
Denmark youth international footballers
Esbjerg fB players
1. FC Nürnberg players
Brøndby IF players
FC Vestsjælland players
FC Roskilde players
Danish Superliga players
Bundesliga players
Danish expatriate men's footballers
Danish expatriate sportspeople in Germany
Expatriate footballers in Germany
Sportspeople from the Region of Southern Denmark